is a passenger railway station located in Tarumi-ku, Kobe, Hyōgo Prefecture, Japan, operated by the private Sanyo Electric Railway.

Lines

Station layout
The station consists of two island platforms connected by an elevated station building. The station is unattended.

Platforms

Adjacent stations

|-
!colspan=5|Sanyo Electric Railway

History
It was renamed to its present name on June 1, 1964

Passenger statistics
In fiscal 2018, the station was used by an average of 1041 passengers daily (boarding passengers only).

Surrounding area
 Goshikizuka (Sentsubo) Kofun
Marinepia Kobe

See also
List of railway stations in Japan

References

External links

 Official website (Sanyo Electric Railway) 

Railway stations in Hyōgo Prefecture
Railway stations in Japan opened in 1917
Railway stations in Kobe